The Samsung Galaxy J7 Prime (also known as On7 Prime/On7 NXT) is an Android-based smartphone unveiled, produced, released and marketed by Samsung Electronics. It was unveiled in August 2016 and released the month after. It was the first J series smartphone to feature an aluminium metal chassis alongside the Galaxy J5 Prime.The new smartphone included several new features that had never been used before on a phone for example the phone featured split screen application modes

Specifications 
The J7 Prime has a 13megapixels Sony Exmor RS IMX258 rear camera with LED flash, f/1.9 aperture, auto-focus and an 8megapixels Samsung's in-house ISOCELL front camera with f/1.9 aperture.

It is powered by an Exynos 7870 SoC including a 1.6 GHz octa-core ARM Cortex-A53 CPU, Mali-T830MP1 GPU with 3 GB RAM. The either 16 or 32 GB of internal storage can be expanded up to 256 GB via microSD card.

The J7 Prime comes with a 5.5-inch Full HD PLS TFT screen, always-on fingerprint sensor and a 3300 mAh battery.

Software 
The J7 Prime was launched with Android 6.0.1 "Marshmallow", running on Samsung's proprietary TouchWiz user interface. It can be upgraded to Android 8.1.0 "Oreo" along with Samsung's user interface, Samsung Experience. It supports VoLTE, Samsung Knox and Samsung's software enhancements.

See also 
 Samsung Galaxy
 Samsung Galaxy J series

References 

Android (operating system) devices
Samsung smartphones
Mobile phones introduced in 2016
Samsung Galaxy